The Mad Martindales is a 1942 American comedy film directed by Alfred L. Werker and written by Francis Edward Faragoh. It is based on the 1939 play Not for Children by Wesley Towner. The film stars Jane Withers, Marjorie Weaver, Alan Mowbray, Jimmy Lydon, Gig Young, George Reeves and Charles Lane. The film was released on May 15, 1942, by 20th Century Fox.

Plot

Cast  
Jane Withers as Kathy Martindale
Marjorie Weaver as Evelyn Martindale
Alan Mowbray as Hugo Martindale
Jimmy Lydon as Bobby Bruce Turner
Gig Young as Peter Varney 
George Reeves as Julio Rigo
Charles Lane as Virgil Hickling
Kathleen Howard as Grandmother Varney
Robert Greig as Wallace Butler
Brandon Hurst as Smythe Butler
Steven Geray as Jan Van Der Venne
Victor Sen Yung as Jefferson Gow
Emma Dunn as Agnes
Hal K. Dawson as Hotel clerk
Don Dillaway as Lawyer
Tom Yuen as Chang Gow
Otto Hoffman as Pawnbroker
Alec Craig as Coachman
Harry Shannon as Policeman
Dick French as Barber
Jack Chefe as Barber

References

External links
 

1942 films
20th Century Fox films
American comedy films
1942 comedy films
Films directed by Alfred L. Werker
American black-and-white films
1940s English-language films
1940s American films
Films with screenplays by Francis Edward Faragoh
American films based on plays